Annette Huber-Klawitter (née Huber, born 23 May 1967) is a German mathematician at the University of Freiburg. Her research interests includes algebraic geometry, in particular the Bloch–Kato conjectures.

A native of Frankfurt am Main, Huber-Klawitter began her academic career at the Goethe University Frankfurt. She obtained her doctorate from the University of Münster in 1994, under the supervision of Christopher Deninger. In 1996 Huber-Klawitter won an EMS Prize. She was an invited speaker at the 2002 International Congress of Mathematicians in Beijing. In 2012 she became a fellow of the American Mathematical Society.

References

External links
Website at the University of Freiburg

1967 births
Living people
20th-century German mathematicians
University of Münster alumni
Academic staff of Leipzig University
Academic staff of the University of Freiburg
Fellows of the American Mathematical Society
Women mathematicians
21st-century German mathematicians